Indrani Haldar is an Indian actress who is mostly known for her work in Bengali cinema. She was conferred with a National Award, three BFJA Awards and two Anandalok Awards.

Halder made her debut in 1986 with the Bengali TV series Tero Parbon directed by Jochon Dastidar. She made her big screen debut opposite Prosenjit Chatterjee in Mandira (1990). She has appeared in numerous films, telefilms and TV series and hit the pinnacle of her career with the Bengali TV series Goyenda Ginni. She appeared in critically acclaimed films such as Charachar, Dahan, Anu, Sajhbatir Rupkathara, Faltu, Tokhon Teish, Mayurakshi to name a few. She has also worked at Maa Shakti by BR Chopra.

Career
Indrani made her acting debut in the television serial Tero Parban (1986). She lived in Mumbai during 2008 to 2013 to act in Hindi TV serials.

In January 2022, she sang the Dwijendralal Ray song "Dhono Dhanne Pushpe Bhora" in a show at the request of one. However, she thought it is Rabindranath Tagore's song. And so she was trolled on social media.

Filmography

 Biswas Abiswas (with Prosenjit Chatterjee)
 Saptami (with Prosenjit Chatterjee)
 Gouri (with Tapas Pal)
 Nilimay Nil (with Tapas Pal)
 Antortomo (with Tapas Pal)
 Jaybijay (with Chiranjit Chakraborty)
 Prem Sanghat (with Chiranjit Chakraborty)
 Debor (with Tapash Paul)
 Bhalobasha (with Prasenjit Chatterjee, Savitri Chatterjee, Manaj Mitra, Bharat Kaul)
 Antarbash (with Debosree Roy, Chiranjeet Chakrabarty, Firdaus Ahmed)
 Tin Bhuboner Paare
 Sesh Ashray (with Arjun Chakraborty)
 Saikat Sangeet
 Sagar Banya (with Prasenjit Chatterjee, Abhisek Chatterjee)
 Chakravyuha
 Atltaayi (with Chiranjeet Chakrabarty)
 Jeebon Pakhi
 Ebong Tumi Aar Aami (with Sanjib Dasgupta, Soumitra Chatterjee)
 Daydayikta (with Prasenjit Chatterjee, Ranjit Mallick, Rituparna Sengupta)
 Apon Holo Par (with Prasenjit Chatterjee)
 Sampradaan (Directed by Bappaditya Banerjee, with Anusuya Majumdar, Sabyasachi Chakrabarty)
 Shwet Patharer Thala (Directed by Prabhat Roy, with Aparna Sen, Sabyasachi Chakrabarty, Dipankar Dey)
 Kaancher Prithibi (with Ayan Banerjee, Labani Sarkar)
 Daan Protidan (with Tapash Paul, Sukhen Das, Koushik Banerjee, Rachana Banerjee)
 Charachar (1993) (Directed by Buddhadeb Dasgupta)
 Biyer Phool (1996) (with Prasenjit Chatterjee, Rani Mukherjee)
 Jamaibabu (with Tapash Paul, Abhisek Chatterjee)
 Lal Darja (1997) (Directed by Buddhadeb Dasgupta)
 Dahan (1997) (with Rituparna Sengupta)
 Anu (Directed by Satarupa Sanyal)
 Paromitar Ek Din (2000)
 Buk Bhara Bhalobasa (2000) (with Arun Govil)
 Dekha (2001) (with Soumitra Chatterjee)
 Bhairav (2001)
 Bor Kone (with Prasenjit Chatterjee)
 Saanjhbatir Roopkathara 
 Debdas (2002)
 Anandalok
 Assassin
 Faltu (2006)
 Asamapto
 Aankush
 Jara Brishtitey Bhijechhilo (2007) 
 Raatporir Rupkatha (with Jackie Shroff)
 Chowdhary Paribar 
 Angshumaner Chhobi (2009)
 Noyoner Alo 
 Antim Swash Sundar
 Banshiwala (2010) (Directed by Anjan Das, with Paoli Dam, Sayan Munshi)
 Takhan Teish (2010) 
 Mistake (2013)
 Strings of Passion (2014)
 Aro Akbar (2015) (with Rituparna, Rupa Ganguli)
 Drishyantar (with Srabanti Chatterjee)
 Mayurakshi
 Sagor Banya (with Prasenjit, Abhishek)
 Dabidar (with Tapash Paul)
 Dadabhai (with Chiranjit)
 Thikana Rajpath (with Debosree, Ferdouse)
 Antorbas (with Chiranjit)
 Kuler Achar (2022)

Television, short films and web series
 "TBA" as protagonist - "ZEE5" Web Series, directed by "Indraneel Roy Chowdhury" (upcoming)
  Ghore Ghore Zee Bangla(Reality show)- Host (Zee Bangla) 
 Seemarekha as Seema and Rekha-Dual role (Zee Bangla)
 Goyenda Ginni as Poroma (Zee Bangla)
 Spandan (Zee Bangla)
 Sreemoyee (Star Jalsha)
 Savitri - EK Prem Kahani as Leena Roy Choudhary (2013)
 Maryada: Lekin Kab Tak? Fakir 
 Tithir Atithi Kuasha Jakhan (with soumitra chatterjee)
 Bahanno Episode(Directed by Rituporno ghosh)
 Tamasharekha (Zee Bangla)
 Purbo Purush Bhool Thikana Jeebon Rekha (Zee Bangla)
 Hamaari Shaadi(Directed by Basu chatterjee)
 Tero Parban Prashchito (NTV Bengali Telefilm)  Pinzor (NTV Bengali Telefilm) Sujata produced by BR chopra
 Maa Shakti by BR Chopra
 Somoy (with Abir Chatterjee, Parno Mitra) (Rupasi Bangla)
 Savitri Sanai(Akash Bangla, with Arunima Ghosh)
 Rajmahal (Akash Aat)
 Bahnishikha Khonik Bosonto (BTV Telefilm 2002)
 Sange Indrani - a weekly interview on Tara TV featuring celebrity guests, hosted by Haldar
 Kapalkundala Kudrat as Ganga Ajaynarayan Seth

Mahalaya

Awards
 Madrid International Film Festival - Best Actress Award for Jara Bristite Bhijechhilo'' (2008)

References

External links
 

Indian film actresses
Living people
Indian soap opera actresses
Best Actress National Film Award winners
Actresses in Hindi cinema
Actresses in Bengali cinema
20th-century Indian actresses
21st-century Indian actresses
Year of birth missing (living people)
Jogamaya Devi College alumni